There's a Hippo in My Tub, rereleased as Anne Murray Sings for the Sesame Street Generation, is a 1977 children's album by Anne Murray. Although the album did not make any of the major charts in the US or Canada, it was certified Platinum in Canada. The album was initially reissued in 1979 by Sesame Street Records retitled Anne Murray Sings for the Sesame Street Generation. It was again reissued in 2001 in CD format by EMI Music Canada, including three extra songs that were not on the original album. It was produced by Pat Riccio Jr.

As Anne Murray Sings for the Sesame Street Generation, the album was nominated for the 1980 Grammy Awards in the Best Children's Album category, where it was up against two other Sesame Street-branded albums and the soundtrack of The Muppet Movie, which won. The synthesizer line from “Teddy Bears’ Picnic” was sampled by the American hip hop group Ugly Duckling as part of the song “Down the Road.”

Track listing (1977)
 "Hey, Daddy" (Bob Ruzicka)	
 "Stars are the Windows of Heaven" (Jimmy Steiger, Tommie Malie)
 "Animal Crackers" (Irving Caesar, Ted Koehler)
 "Hi-Lili, Hi-Lo" (Bronisław Kaper, Helen Deutsch)	 
 "Why, Oh, Why (Why, Why, Why)" (Woody Guthrie)
 "Teddy Bears' Picnic"	(Jimmy Kennedy, John Walter Bratton)
 "Inchworm" (Frank Loesser)	 
 "You Are My Sunshine/Open Up Your Heart" (Stuart Hamblen, Charles Mitchell)	 
 "Sleepytime" (John Renton)	
  "Lullaby Medley: Hush Little Baby/Sleep Child/Brahms Lullaby" (Traditional, Robbie MacNeill)

Track listing (2001 reissue)
 "Hey, Daddy" (Bob Ruzicka)	
 "Stars Are the Windows of Heaven" (Jimmy Steiger, Tommie Malie)
 "Animal Crackers" (Irving Caesar, Ted Koehler)
 "Hi-Lili, Hi-Lo" (Bronisław Kaper, Helen Deutsch)	 
 "Why, Oh, Why (Why, Why, Why)" (Woody Guthrie)
 "Teddy Bears' Picnic"	(Jimmy Kennedy, John Walter Bratton)
  "Sing High, Sing Low" (Brent Titcomb)	 
 "Inchworm" (Frank Loesser)	 
 "You Are My Sunshine/Open Up Your Heart" (Stuart Hamblen, Charles Mitchell)	 
 "I Can See Clearly Now" (Johnny Nash)	
  "What a Wonderful World" (Robert Thiele Jr., George David Weiss)	 
 "Sleepytime" (John Renton)	
  "Lullaby Medley: Hush Little Baby/Sleep Child/Brahms Lullaby" (Traditional, Robbie MacNeill)

Chart performance

Personnel
Anne Murray—lead vocals
Lisa Dryburgh, Christine MacIntosh, Kathleen Langstroth, Aidan Mason, Anne Murray, Pat Riccio Jr., Lisa Wonnacott—backing vocals
Pete Cardinali—bass guitar
Paul Beedham—drums
Sid Beckwith—flute
Bob Mann, Aidan Mason, Miles Wilkinson—guitar
John Mills Cockell, Pat Riccio Jr.—keyboards
Bob Lucier—steel guitar
Rick Wilkins—string arrangements

References

1977 albums
Anne Murray albums
Capitol Records albums
Children's music albums by Canadian artists
Juno Award for Children's Album of the Year albums